The 2017 Little Rock Trojans baseball team represented the University of Arkansas at Little Rock during the 2017 NCAA Division I baseball season. The Trojans played their home games at Gary Hogan Field and were coaches by third year head coach Chris Curry. They were members of the Sun Belt Conference.

Roster

Coaching staff

Schedule and results
Little Rock Trojans announced its 2017 baseball schedule on October 24, 2016. The 2017 schedule consists of 28 home and 27 away games in the regular season. The Trojans hosted Sun Belts foes Appalachian State, Georgia State, Louisiana, Texas State, and Troy and traveled to Arkansas State, Georgia Southern, Louisiana–Monroe, South Alabama, and Texas-Arlington.

The 2017 Sun Belt Conference Championship was contested May 24–28 in Statesboro, Georgia, and was be hosted by Georgia Southern.

 Rankings are based on the team's current  ranking in the Collegiate Baseball poll.

References

Little Rock
Little Rock Trojans baseball seasons